Dentarene munita is a species of small sea snail, a marine gastropod mollusk, in the family Liotiidae.

This is a replacement name for Delphinula muricata Reeve, 1843, non Calcara, 1841

Description
The size of the shell varies between 12 mm and 20 mm. The shell is rather narrowly umbilicated. It has a pale orange yellow color, radiated and spotted with a reddish chestnut. The three whorls contain scaly-prickly keels at the periphery and are slopingly flattened above. The suture is excavated. The surface above and below contain minutely beaded revolving striae.

Distribution
This marine species occurs off Queensland, Australia.

References

External links
 To World Register of Marine Species

munita
Gastropods described in 1929